Andrea Burato (born 2 July 1990) is an Italian professional footballer who plays for Serie D club Milano City as a midfielder.

He made his Serie A debut for A.C. ChievoVerona on 31 May 2009 in a game against S.S.C. Napoli when he came on as a substitute in the 74th minute for Giuseppe Colucci.

References

External links

Italian footballers
Serie A players
Serie C players
Serie D players
A.C. ChievoVerona players
Hellas Verona F.C. players
F.C. Südtirol players
Mantova 1911 players
Treviso F.B.C. 1993 players
A.C. Mezzocorona players
A.S.D. Olimpia Colligiana players
A.S.D. Jolly Montemurlo players
U.S. Folgore Caratese A.S.D. players
S.S.D. Città di Gela players
1990 births
Living people
Association football midfielders
Milano City F.C. players